Gemerská Hôrka is a village and municipality in the Rožňava District in the Košice Region of middle-eastern Slovakia.

History
In historical records the village was first mentioned in 1413.

Geography
The village lies at an altitude of 227 metres and covers an area of 12.794 km².
It has a population of about 1330 people.

Culture
The village has a football pitch.

Genealogical resources

The records for genealogical research are available at the state archive "Statny Archiv in Banska Bystrica, Kosice, Slovakia"
 Roman Catholic church records (births/marriages/deaths): 1825-1895 (parish B)
 Lutheran church records (births/marriages/deaths): 1805-1908 (parish B)
 Reformated church records (births/marriages/deaths): 1792-1916 (parish A)

See also
 List of municipalities and towns in Slovakia

External links
 http://www.gemerskahorka.eu/
 https://web.archive.org/web/20090724101857/http://www.gemhorka.sk/
 https://web.archive.org/web/20080111223415/http://www.statistics.sk/mosmis/eng/run.html 
 http://www.gemerskahorka.ou.sk/
 Surnames of living people in Gemerska Horka

Villages and municipalities in Rožňava District